Doğa Bora Akkaş (born 12 October 1990) is a Turkish actor and occasional singer.

Life and career 
Akkaş was primarily trained in city theaters and acted for the first time in the movie Gönlümdeki Köşk Olmasa. He received the Golden Orange award for his performance in this film. He simultaneously started his music career and was a bass guitar member of the music band "Hakunamatata". Initially, he worked under A4 Records, but he later continued his work and produced tracks on his own. In 2008, he was a contestant on the "Miller Music Factory" competition together with Deniz Gürzumar, with whome he performed the song "Bize Kızma" and ranked second. In 2009, he starred in the movie Adab-ı Muaşeret. He was recognized for his role as Zekai Kirişçi in the TV series Geniş Aile. He was also a regular in the series Annem Uyurken, where he played the role of Mert. Akkaş's other notable credits include Her Şey Yolunda Merkez, Bebek İşi and Yüksek Giriş.

Personal life 
On 19 August 2017 he married actress . In August 2019, Türkmen filed for divorce. Their divorce was finalized in September 2019. On 3 February 2023, he married blogger Oben Alkan.

Credits

TV series 
 Dişi Kuş (2004)
 Yağmur Zamanı (Bora) (2004)
 Son Tercih (Mert) (2007)
 Cesaretin Var mı Aşka (2008)
 Unutma Beni (2008)
 Geniş Aile (Zekai Kirişçi) (2009–2011)
 Annem Uyurken (Mert) (2012)
 Herşey Yolunda Merkez (Efe Selim) (2013)
 Herşey Yolunda (Efe Selim) (2013)
 Yüksek Giriş (Doğukan) (2013)
 Bebek İşi (Ozan) (2013)
 Boynu Bükükler (Mithat) (2014)
 Ruhumun Aynası (Çetin) (2014)
 Çifte Saadet (Tarık Çatık) (2016)
 Dayan Yüreğim (Rıfat) (2017)
Aslan Ailem (Mutlu Aslan) (2017–2018)
 Kurşun (Rıfat Ayaz) (2019)
Dengi Dengine (Mert) (2019)
 Tutunamayanlar (Yağiz) (2020)
 Menajerimi Ara (Himself) (2020)
 Yeşilçam (Hakan) (2021)
 İçimizden Biri (Adam Wilson) (2021)
 Üç Kuruş (Çetin) (2022)

Film 
 Gönlümdeki Köşk Olmasa (Küçük Osman) (2002)
 Küçük Kıyamet (Batu) (2007)
 Adab-ı Muaşeret (Eko)  (2009)
 Memleket Meselesi (2010) 
 Çalgı Çengi (2010)
 Kaos: Örümcek Ağı (2012)
 Yavuz (2012)
 Taş Mektep (2013)
 Kocan Kadar Konuş (Mehmet Lütfı) (2015)
 Öğrenci İşleri (Umut) (2015) 
 Geniş Aile: Yapıştır (Zekai) (2015)
 Kocan Kadar Konuş: Diriliş (Mehmet Lütfı) (2016) 
 Annemin Yarası (Salih) (2016)
 Geniş Aile 2: Her Türlü (Zekai) (2016)
Ay Lav Yu Tuu (Fırat) (2017)
 Hürkuş: Göklerdeki Kahraman (Mehmet) (2018)
 Sen Hiç Atesböcegi Gördün mü? (Veli) (2021)

Theatre 

 Kabin (2013)
 Yen (2016)

References

External links 
 
 Profile at 
 

1990 births
Turkish male television actors
Living people
Turkish male film actors
Male actors from Istanbul